Cosmos is the first full-length record released by space rock/prog duo Zombi. All songs were written by both members of the duo, except "Cassiopeia" and "Andromeda" which were written and performed by bassist-keyboard player Steve Moore.

Track listing
All Songs Written by Zombi, except where noted.

Personnel
Steve Moore: Fender Bass, Korg Polysix, SCI Prophet 600, SCI Pro One, Roland Juno 106
A.E. Paterra: Drums, Percussion, Cymbals, Moog Source, SCI Six Trak

Production
Arranged & Produced By Zombi
Recorded, Engineered & Mixed By Steve Moore
Mastered By Scott Hull (Pig Destroyer) at Visceral Sound

References

Zombi, "Cosmos" CD Liner Notes.  2004, Relapse Records.

2004 albums
Zombi (band) albums
Relapse Records albums